This is a list of the mammal species recorded in Brunei.

The following tags are used to highlight each species' conservation status as assessed by the International Union for Conservation of Nature:

Some species were assessed using an earlier set of criteria. Species assessed using this system have the following instead of near threatened and least concern categories:

Order: Sirenia (manatees and dugongs) 

Sirenia is an order of fully aquatic, herbivorous mammals that inhabit rivers, estuaries, coastal marine waters, swamps, and marine wetlands. All four species are endangered.
Family: Dugongidae
Genus: Dugong
Dugong, D. dugon

Order: Scandentia (treeshrews) 

The treeshrews are small mammals native to the tropical forests of Southeast Asia. Although called treeshrews, they are not true shrews and are not all arboreal.
Family: Tupaiidae (tree shrews)
Genus: Tupaia
Long-footed treeshrew, T. longipes 
Painted treeshrew, T. picta 
Large treeshrew, T. tana

Order: Dermoptera (colugos) 

The two species of colugos make up the order Dermoptera. They are arboreal gliding mammals found in Southeast Asia.

Family: Cynocephalidae (flying lemurs)
Genus: Galeopterus
 Sunda flying lemur, G. variegatus

Order: Primates 

The order Primates contains humans and their closest relatives: lemurs, lorisoids, monkeys, and apes.
Suborder: Strepsirrhini
Infraorder: Lemuriformes
Superfamily: Lorisoidea
Family: Lorisidae
Genus: Nycticebus
Philippine slow loris, N. menagensis 
Suborder: Haplorhini
Infraorder: Tarsiiformes
Family: Tarsiidae (tarsiers)
Genus: Cephalopachus
 Horsfield's tarsier, C. bancanus 
Infraorder: Simiiformes
Parvorder: Catarrhini
Superfamily: Cercopithecoidea
Family: Cercopithecidae (Old World monkeys)
Genus: Macaca
Crab-eating macaque, M. fascicularis 
 Southern pig-tailed macaque, M. nemestrina
Subfamily: Colobinae
Genus: Presbytis
 Banded surili, Presbytis femoralis
 White-fronted surili, Presbytis frontata
 Hose's langur, Presbytis hosei
 Maroon leaf monkey, Presbytis rubicunda
Genus: Nasalis
Proboscis monkey, N. larvatus 
Superfamily: Hominoidea
Family: Hylobatidae (gibbons)
Genus: Hylobates
 Müller's bornean gibbon, Hylobates muelleri
Family: Hominidae (great apes)
Subfamily: Ponginae
Genus: Pongo
Bornean orangutan, P. pygmaeus  presence uncertain

Order: Rodentia (rodents) 

Rodents make up the largest order of mammals, with over 40% of mammalian species. They have two incisors in the upper and lower jaw which grow continually and must be kept short by gnawing. Most rodents are small though the capybara can weigh up to 45 kg (100 lb).

Suborder: Hystricomorpha
Family: Hystricidae (Old World porcupines)
Genus: Hystrix
 Thick-spined porcupine, Hystrix crassispinis LR/nt
Genus: Trichys
 Long-tailed porcupine, Trichys fasciculata LR/lc
Suborder: Sciurognathi
Family: Sciuridae (squirrels)
Subfamily: Ratufinae
Genus: Ratufa
 Cream-coloured giant squirrel, Ratufa affinis LR/lc
Subfamily: Sciurinae
Tribe: Pteromyini
Genus: Aeromys
 Black flying squirrel, Aeromys tephromelas LR/lc
Genus: Pteromyscus
 Smoky flying squirrel, Pteromyscus pulverulentus LR/nt
Subfamily: Callosciurinae
Genus: Exilisciurus
 Least pygmy squirrel, Exilisciurus exilis LR/lc
Genus: Rhinosciurus
 Shrew-faced squirrel, Rhinosciurus laticaudatus LR/lc
Genus: Sundasciurus
 Horse-tailed squirrel, Sundasciurus hippurus LR/lc

Order: Erinaceomorpha (hedgehogs and gymnures) 

The order Erinaceomorpha contains a single family, Erinaceidae, which comprise the hedgehogs and gymnures. The hedgehogs are easily recognised by their spines while gymnures look more like large rats.

Family: Erinaceidae (hedgehogs)
Subfamily: Galericinae
Genus: Hylomys
 Short-tailed gymnure, Hylomys suillus LR/lc

Order: Soricomorpha (shrews, moles, and solenodons) 

The "shrew-forms" are insectivorous mammals. The shrews and solenodons closely resemble mice while the moles are stout-bodied burrowers.

Family: Soricidae (shrews)
Subfamily: Crocidurinae
Genus: Crocidura
 Southeast Asian shrew, Crocidura fuliginosa LR/lc

Order: Chiroptera (bats) 

The bats' most distinguishing feature is that their forelimbs are developed as wings, making them the only mammals capable of flight. Bat species account for about 20% of all mammals.

Family: Pteropodidae (flying foxes, Old World fruit bats)
Subfamily: Pteropodinae
Genus: Aethalops
 Pygmy fruit bat, Aethalops alecto LR/nt
Genus: Balionycteris
 Spotted-winged fruit bat, Balionycteris maculata LR/lc
Genus: Dyacopterus
 Dayak fruit bat, Dyacopterus spadiceus LR/nt
Genus: Megaerops
 White-collared fruit bat, Megaerops wetmorei LR/lc
Genus: Pteropus
 Large flying fox, Pteropus vampyrus LR/lc
Subfamily: Macroglossinae
Genus: Eonycteris
 Greater dawn bat, Eonycteris major LR/lc
Family: Vespertilionidae
Subfamily: Kerivoulinae
Genus: Kerivoula
 Papillose woolly bat, Kerivoula papillosa LR/lc
 Clear-winged woolly bat, Kerivoula pellucida LR/lc
 Painted bat, Kerivoula picta LR/lc
 Whitehead's woolly bat, Kerivoula whiteheadi LR/lc
Subfamily: Vespertilioninae
Genus: Glischropus
 Common thick-thumbed bat, Glischropus tylopus LR/lc
Genus: Hesperoptenus
 Blanford's bat, Hesperoptenus blanfordi LR/lc
Genus: Hypsugo
 Big-eared pipistrelle, Hypsugo macrotis LR/nt
Genus: Philetor
 Rohu's bat, Philetor brachypterus LR/lc
Genus: Pipistrellus
 Kelaart's pipistrelle, Pipistrellus ceylonicus LR/lc
 Narrow-winged pipistrelle, Pipistrellus stenopterus LR/lc
Subfamily: Murininae
Genus: Murina
 Brown tube-nosed bat, Murina suilla LR/lc
Family: Emballonuridae
Genus: Emballonura
 Small Asian sheath-tailed bat, Emballonura alecto LR/lc
Family: Rhinolophidae
Subfamily: Rhinolophinae
Genus: Rhinolophus
 Acuminate horseshoe bat, Rhinolophus acuminatus LR/lc
 Intermediate horseshoe bat, Rhinolophus affinis LR/lc
 Bornean horseshoe bat, Rhinolophus borneensis LR/lc
 Woolly horseshoe bat, Rhinolophus luctus LR/lc
 Lesser woolly horseshoe bat, Rhinolophus sedulus LR/lc
 Trefoil horseshoe bat, Rhinolophus trifoliatus LR/lc

Order: Pholidota (pangolins) 

The order Pholidota comprises the eight species of pangolin. Pangolins are anteaters and have the powerful claws, elongated snout and long tongue seen in the other unrelated anteater species.
Family: Manidae
Genus: Manis
Sunda pangolin, M. javanica

Order: Cetacea (whales) 

The order Cetacea includes whales, dolphins and porpoises. They are the mammals most fully adapted to aquatic life with a spindle-shaped nearly hairless body, protected by a thick layer of blubber, and forelimbs and tail modified to provide propulsion underwater.
Suborder:Mysticeti
Superfamily:Balaenopteroidea
Family:Balaenopteridae
Genus: Balaenoptera
 Common minke whale, Balaenoptera acutorostrata LC
 Antarctic minke whale, Balaenoptera bonaerensis DD
 Sei whale, Balaenoptera borealis EN
 Bryde's whale, Balaenoptera brydei DD
 Blue whale, Balaenoptera musculus EN
 Fin whale, Balaenoptera physalus EN
Genus: Megaptera
 Humpback whale, Megaptera novaeangliae LC
Suborder: Odontoceti
Superfamily: Platanistoidea
Family: Phocoenidae
Genus: Neophocaena
 Finless porpoise, Neophocaena phocaenoides DD
Family: Delphinidae (marine dolphins)
Genus: Feresa
 Pygmy killer whale, Feresa attenuata DD
Genus: Globicephala
 Short-finned pilot whale, Globicephala macrorhynchus DD
Genus: Sousa
 Indo-Pacific humpbacked dolphin, Sousa chinensis DD
Genus: Tursiops
 Common bottlenose dolphin, Tursiops truncatus LC
 Indo-Pacific bottlenose dolphin, Tursiops aduncus DD
Genus: Lagenodelphis
 Fraser's dolphin, Lagenodelphis hosei DD
Genus: Grampus
 Risso's dolphin, Grampus griseus DD
Genus: Orcaella
Irrawaddy dolphin, O. brevirostris 
Genus: Orcinus
Orca, O. orca 
Genus: Peponocephala
Melon-headed whale, Peponocephala electra DD
Genus: Pseudorca
 False killer whale, Pseudorca crassidens DD
Genus: Stenella
 Pantropical spotted dolphin, Stenella attenuata LC
 Striped dolphin, Stenella coeruleoalba LC
 Spinner dolphin, Stenella longirostris DD
Genus: Steno
 Rough-toothed dolphin, Steno bredanensis LC
Family: Kogiidae
Genus: Kogia
Pygmy sperm whale, K. breviceps 
 Dwarf sperm whale, Kogia sima DD
Superfamily:Physeteroidea
Family: Physeteridae (sperm whales)
Genus: Physeter
 Sperm whale, Physeter macrocephalus VU
Superfamily Ziphioidea
Family: Ziphidae (beaked whales)
Genus: Indopacetus
 Tropical bottlenose whale, Indopacetus pacificus DD
Genus: Mesoplodon
 Blainville's beaked whale, Mesoplodon densirostris DD
 Ginkgo-toothed beaked whale, Mesoplodon ginkgodens DD
Genus: Ziphius
 Cuvier's beaked whale, Ziphius cavirostris DD

Order: Carnivora (carnivorans) 

There are over 260 species of carnivorans, the majority of which feed primarily on meat. They have a characteristic skull shape and dentition.
Suborder: Feliformia
Family: Felidae (cats)
Subfamily: Felinae
Genus: Catopuma
Bay cat, C. badia  presence uncertain
Genus: Pardofelis
Marbled cat, P. marmorata 
Genus: Prionailurus
Sunda leopard cat, P. javanensis
Flat-headed cat, P. planiceps 
Subfamily: Pantherinae
Genus: Neofelis
Sunda clouded leopard, N. diardi 
Family: Viverridae (civets, mongooses, etc.)
Subfamily: Paradoxurinae
Genus: Arctictis
Binturong, A. binturong 
Genus: Arctogalidia
Small-toothed palm civet, A. trivirgata 
Genus: Paradoxurus
Asian palm civet, P. hermaphroditus  
Subfamily: Hemigalinae
Genus: Cynogale
 Otter civet, C. bennettii 
Genus: Hemigalus
 Banded palm civet, H. derbyanus 
Subfamily: Prionodontinae
Genus: Prionodon
 Banded linsang, P. linsang 
Subfamily: Viverrinae
Genus: Viverra
 Malayan civet, V. tangalunga 
Family: Herpestidae (mongooses)
Genus: Urva
 Collared mongoose, U. semitorquata 
Suborder: Caniformia
Family: Ursidae (bears)
Genus: Helarctos
 Sun bear, H. malayanus 
Family: Mustelidae (mustelids)
Genus: Aonyx
 Oriental small-clawed otter, A. cinereus 
Genus: Lutra
 Hairy-nosed otter, L. sumatrana  possibly extirpated
Genus: Lutrogale
 Smooth-coated otter, L. perspicillata 
Genus: Martes
 Yellow-throated marten, M. flavigula 
Genus: Mustela
 Malayan weasel, M. nudipes 
Genus: Mydaus
 Sunda stink badger, M. javanensis

Order: Perissodactyla (odd-toed ungulates) 

The odd-toed ungulates are browsing and grazing mammals. They are usually large to very large, and have relatively simple stomachs and a large middle toe.

Family: Rhinocerotidae
Genus: Dicerorhinus
 Sumatran rhinoceros, D. sumatrensis  extirpated

Order: Artiodactyla (even-toed ungulates) 

The even-toed ungulates are ungulates whose weight is borne about equally by the third and fourth toes, rather than mostly or entirely by the third as in perissodactyls. There are about 220 artiodactyl species, including many that are of great economic importance to humans.

Family: Suidae (pigs)
Subfamily: Suinae
Genus: Sus
 Bornean bearded pig, S. barbatus 
Family: Tragulidae
Genus: Tragulus
 Lesser mouse deer, T. javanicus 
 Napu, T. napu 
Family: Bovidae (cattle, antelope, sheep, goats)
Subfamily: Bovinae
Genus: Bos
 Banteng, B. javanicus  extirpated

References

External links

See also
List of chordate orders
Lists of mammals by region
Mammal classification

 
Mammals
Brunei
 Brunei
Brunei Darussalam